Dewal also known as Dewal Sharif is a Union council of Murree Tehsil, a sub division of Murree District in the Punjab province of Pakistan.

According to the 1998 census of Pakistan it had a population of 11,052.

Dewal and Dewal Shareef
Dewal is a Sanskrit word means a small temple, but Pir Abdul Majid (Pir Sahib Dewal Shareef) who migrated to Rawalpindi in mid fifties last century and established a shrine with the support of Ex-President of Pakistan General Ayub Khan, in Faizabad between Islamabad and Rawalpindi translated and Islamized Hindu small temple common noun Dewal into Dewal Shareef.

References

Union councils of Murree Tehsil
Populated places in Murree Tehsil